The Vietnamese Ambassador to the United States is the official representative of the Vietnamese government to the government of the United States. The ambassador lives in Washington, D.C.

List of ambassadors

See also
Vietnam–United States relations

References

Ambassadors of South Vietnam to the United States
United States
Vietnam